Schwäbisch Hall-Hessental station (called Hessental until 1933) is the more important of the two stations of the major district town of Schwäbisch Hall in the German state of Baden-Württemberg. It is a junction station (classified by Deutsche Bahn as a category 4 station) where the Waiblingen–Schwäbisch Hall railway (Murrbahn) branches off the Crailsheim–Heilbronn railway (Hohenlohebahn).

Location

Schwäbisch Hall-Hessental station is four kilometres from Schwäbisch Hall, located in the district of Hessental. In the immediate vicinity of the station are the Breitloh/Karl-Kurz-Areal industrial area on the site of the former Kurz barrel factory, which was one of the largest companies in the city of Schwäbisch Hall until its bankruptcy in 1998.

History

The station precinct emerged in December 1867 with the opening of the Crailsheim–Heilbronn railway, then called the Kocherbahn ("Kocher Railway", referring to the Kocher river). The line was built at the request of the population and followed its approval by the Württemberg Chamber of Deputies in 1860. The entrance building was not built until twelve years later, when the line was completed from Waiblingen to Hessental via Backnang and Gaildorf. As a result of the new connection, Schwäbisch Hall-Hessental station  became operationally more significant that Schwäbisch Hall station, which was more centrally located in the town.

The Hessental concentration camp, which still existed in April 1945, was established in Alsace in a former barracks of the Reich Labour Service at Hessental station in the summer of 1944 as a sub-camp of the Natzweiler-Struthof camp. The first assignment of 600 prisoners arrived on 14 October 1944.

On 1 December 1988, a relay interlocking of the SpDr L 60 class was taken into operation, it gradually took remote control of signalling at the surrounding stations: Sulzdorf and Gaildorf West in March 1989 and Schwäbisch Hall on 1 January 1990.

In 1996, the line from Backnang via Hessental to Crailsheim, including the tracks through the station, were electrified. The line towards Heilbronn via Schwäbisch Hall station is still not electrified.

Operations

Schwäbisch Hall Hessental is served (as of 2014) by Regional-Express and Regionalbahn trains running at two hour intervals on the route from Öhringen or Heilbronn to Crailsheim and on the route between Stuttgart and Nuremberg.

Platforms

Schwäbisch Hall Hessental station has three platform tracks, platform 1, which is next to the station building, and an island platform with two tracks. Platform 1 and platform 2 are used for main line services running through on the Crailsheim–Heilbronn railway. Platform 1 is used for trains running to and from Öhringen and continuing to Heilbronn, tracks 2 and 3 on the island platform are used for services on the line between Stuttgart and Crailsheim. Next to track 3 is track 4, which is a passing loop without a platforms.

West of the station, there was a 1.5 kilometre-long rail siding to the former Schwäbisch Hall Hessental airbase. Some sidings are still connected to the west of the station.

References

External links
 
 

Railway stations in Germany opened in 1867
Buildings and structures in Schwäbisch Hall (district)
Railway stations in Baden-Württemberg
19th-century establishments in Württemberg
Schwäbisch Hall